Leandro Costa Miranda Moraes or simply Leandrão (born 18 July 1983) is a Brazilian professional football manager and former player who is the current head coach of Boavista.

Club statistics

Honours 
Internacional
 Campeonato Gaúcho: 2002, 2005, 2008, 2009

Sport
 Campeonato Pernambucano: 2010

ABC
 Campeonato Brasileiro Série C: 2010
 Campeonato Potiguar: 2011

Remo
 Campeonato Paraense: 2014

Boavista
 Copa Rio: 2017

External links

 
 

1983 births
Living people
People from Uberlândia
Brazilian footballers
Brazilian football managers
Association football forwards
Boavista Sport Club players
Campeonato Brasileiro Série A players
Campeonato Brasileiro Série B players
Campeonato Brasileiro Série C players
J1 League players
K League 1 players
Israeli Premier League players
Brazilian expatriate footballers
Expatriate footballers in Japan
Expatriate footballers in South Korea
Expatriate footballers in Israel
Brazilian expatriate sportspeople in Japan
Brazilian expatriate sportspeople in South Korea
Brazilian expatriate sportspeople in Israel
Sport Club Internacional players
Botafogo de Futebol e Regatas players
Vissel Kobe players
Daejeon Hana Citizen FC players
Ulsan Hyundai FC players
Jeonnam Dragons players
Esporte Clube Vitória players
Sport Club do Recife players
ABC Futebol Clube players
Associação Atlética Ponte Preta players
Associação Desportiva São Caetano players
Rio Branco Esporte Clube players
Hapoel Acre F.C. players
Clube do Remo players
Esporte Clube Novo Hamburgo players
Grêmio Esportivo Brasil players
CR Vasco da Gama players
Boavista Sport Club managers
Sportspeople from Minas Gerais